Abl interactor 1 also known as Abelson interactor 1 (Abi-1) is a protein that in humans is encoded by the ABI1 gene.

Function 

Abl interactor 1 has been found to form a complex with EPS8 and SOS1, and is thought to be involved in the transduction of signals from Ras to Rac. In addition, the encoded protein may play a role in the regulation of EGF-induced Erk pathway activation as well as cytoskeletal reorganization and EGFR signaling. Several transcript variants encoding multiple isoforms have been found for this gene.

Abi1 is adaptor protein. It interacts with c-Abl and WAVE2 which is an actin polymerization regulator. It is known that Abi1 enhances the phosphorylation of WAVE2 by c-Abl. The phosphorylation of c-Abl promotes actin polymerization. Furthermore, Abi1 is a component of the WAVE complex. Some research has shown that knockdown of Abi1 by siRNA promoted degradation of WAVE complex proteins.

Interactions
ABI1 has been shown to interact with

ENAH, NCKAP1, EPS8, and SOS1.

References

Further reading

External links